Piankhher (Pi-ankh-her) was a Nubian queen with the Egyptian title king's wife. Her royal husband is not known for sure, but for chronological reason it seems to be Aramatle-qo. Piankhher is known solely from her burial at Nuri (Nu 57) . Her burial consisted of a pyramid, that was totally gone when excavated. There is a staircase going down to the two burial chambers that were found looted. Some golden and silver amulets were found. About 200 shabtis, many only in fragments, were discovered too. They provide her name and title.

References 

6th-century BC women
Queens of Kush